The 2003 CAM Open Comunidad Valenciana was a men's tennis tournament played on outdoor clay courts in Valencia, Spain and was part of the International Series of the 2003 ATP Tour. It was the 9th edition of the tournament and was held from 28 April through 4 May 2003. First-seeded Juan Carlos Ferrero won the singles title.

Finals

Singles

 Juan Carlos Ferrero defeated  Christophe Rochus 6–2, 6–4
 It was Ferrero's 2nd title of the year and the 9th of his career.

Doubles

 Lucas Arnold /  Mariano Hood defeated  Brian MacPhie /  Nenad Zimonjić 6–1, 6–7(7–9), 6–4
 It was Arnold's 1st title of the year and the 10th of his career. It was Hood's 1st title of the year and the 5th of his career.

References

External links
 Official website 
 ATP tournament profile

 
Val
Valencia Open
Val
April 2003 sports events in Europe
May 2003 sports events in Europe